Chapter 1 is the first solo album of Japanese idol Yuma Nakayama.

Chapter 1 is released in Japan on 26 November 2014 by Johnnys Entertainment. There are two versions the Limited Edition and the Regular Edition.
This album also has an event ID for Nakayama Yuma's Special Event in 2015 (together with the event IDs in Get Up! single).

Track listing 
Limited Edition 1 – Single (CD＋DVD)

CD
 High Five
 Kōsaten
 XOXO ( Kiss Hug)
 Missing Piece
 Mai, Koi (Dance, Love)
 Iolite
 Bokutachi no birthday
 Get Up!
 Akuma na Koi (Album Ver.)
 In The Name of Love

DVD
　50 minute video has been decided short film「Kōsaten」 & Making

①Booklet
②DVD
③Nakayama Yuma Special Event ID

Regular Edition (CD)
 High Five
 Kōsaten
 XOXO (Kiss Hug [Kisuhagu])
 Missing Piece
 Mai, Koi (Dance, Love)
 Iolite
 Bokutachi no birthday
 Oyasumi
 Hustler
 Get Up!
 Akuma na Koi (Album Ver.)
 Kiseki, Mitsuke ni (Miracle, to discover)
 In The Name of Love

①Booklet
②Nakayama Yuma Special Event ID (First Press)

Charts and certifications

References

External links
 Chapter 1 Johnnys net
  Chapter 1 JEHP

2014 albums